Have You Heard: Jim Croce Live  is a live album by American singer-songwriter Jim Croce, released in 2006, over thirty years after his death. The album is a companion to a DVD released in 2003 of Jim Croce's performances. The recordings were taken from different television programs that Croce appeared on. Two of the tracks on the DVD, "Time in a Bottle" and "I'll Have to Say I Love You in a Song" were cut from the CD release because they were not live performances.

Track listing

Personnel
Jim Croce – guitar, vocals
Maury Muehleisen  – guitar, vocals

References

Jim Croce albums
Live albums published posthumously
2006 live albums
2006 video albums
Live video albums
Shout! Factory albums
Video albums published posthumously